Kearney Regional Airport  (formerly Kearney Municipal Airport) is an airport five miles northeast of Kearney in Buffalo County, Nebraska. Denver Air Connection provides scheduled passenger service to Denver which is supported by the Essential Air Service.

Federal Aviation Administration records say the airport had 11,956 passenger boardings (enplanements) in calendar year 2008, 10,113 in 2009 and 9,530 in 2010. The National Plan of Integrated Airport Systems for 2011–2015 categorized it as a primary commercial service airport based on enplanements over 10,000 in 2008, but is non-primary commercial service based on enplanements in 2010.

History 

In 1940 Kearney had a population of 9,643. In the early 1940s, three Nebraska cities, Kearney, Grand Island and Hastings joined to form the Central Nebraska Defense Council when it was learned that the United States Army Air Forces was considering the site for a military airfield. The group attempted to convince Washington that central Nebraska was suitable. Kearney and Grand Island effectively competed as locations for defense airports which would serve as storage for aircraft made at Offutt Field and the Glenn L. Martin Bomber Plant near Omaha.

As early as 1941 the City of Kearney voted on a $60,000 bond to finance a new airport. Kearney Regional Airport began as Keens Municipal Airport.  The cost was more than $360,000, with the balance funded by the Works Progress Administration (WPA). Construction began at the site on Highway 30 on October 21, 1941, and was dedicated as Keens Airport on August 23, 1942, with asphalt runways and one hangar. A handful of buildings from the military era remain at Kearney Airport, notably Hangar #385.

The first airline flights were Mid-West Cessna 190s in 1950–52, then Frontier DC-3s appeared in 1959. Frontier's Convairs lasted until 1979.

Facilities
Kearney Regional Airport covers 2,500 acres (1,012 ha) at an elevation of 2,131 feet (650 m). It has two runways: 18/36 is 7,094 by 100 feet (2,162 x 30 m) concrete; 13/31 is 4,498 by 75 feet (1,371 x 23 m) concrete.

In the year ending September 30, 2011 the airport had 30,040 aircraft operations, average 82 per day: 93% general aviation, 5% airline, and 2% air taxi. 29 aircraft were then based at the airport: 83% single-engine, 14% multi-engine, and 3% helicopter.

Airline and destinations

Passenger

Cargo

See also 
 List of airports in Nebraska

References

Other sources 

 Essential Air Service documents (Docket OST-1996-1715) from the U.S. Department of Transportation:
 Order 2004-5-15 (May 20, 2004): selecting Great Lakes Aviation, Ltd., to provide essential air service with subsidy support at Grand Island, Kearney, McCook, North Platte, and Scottsbluff, Nebraska, for two years at a total annual subsidy of $5,233,287.
 Order 2006-6-26 (June 21, 2006): selecting Great Lakes Aviation, Ltd.. to provide essential air service with subsidy support at Kearney, North Platte, and Scottsbluff, Nebraska, for two years, beginning when Mesa Air Group d/b/a Air Midwest inaugurates service at Grand Island and McCook, at a total annual subsidy of $2,393,305 ($897,142 for Kearney; $976,026 for North Platte; and $520,137 for Scottsbluff). Each community will receive three nonstop round trips to Denver each weekday and weekend (18 total round trips per week) with Beech 1900-D aircraft.
 Order 2008-7-33 (July 29, 2008): selecting Great Lakes Aviation, Ltd. to provide subsidized essential air service (EAS) at Kearney, North Platte, and Scottsbluff, Nebraska, for the two-year period beginning November 1, 2008, at a combined annual subsidy of $5,373,700 with 19-seat Beech 1900D aircraft.
 Order 2010-9-10 (September 8, 2010): re-selecting Great Lakes Aviation, Ltd., operating as both a United Airlines and Frontier Airlines code share-partner (Great Lakes), to provide essential air service (EAS) at Kearney, North Platte, and Scottsbluff, Nebraska, for a combined annual subsidy of $5,344,690 for the two-year period from November 1, 2010, to October 31, 2012.

External links 
 www.FlyKearney.com
 Kearney AAF Historical Website
 Aerial image as of April 1999 from USGS The National Map
 
 

Airports in Nebraska
Buildings and structures in Buffalo County, Nebraska
Essential Air Service
Transportation in Buffalo County, Nebraska
Kearney, Nebraska